William Burbury (11 February 1836 – 20 November 1905) was an Australian politician.

Burbury was born in Oatlands, Tasmania. In 1899 he was elected to the Tasmanian House of Assembly, representing the seat of Oatlands. He served until his seat was abolished in 1903. He died in 1905 in Hobart.

References

1836 births
1905 deaths
Members of the Tasmanian House of Assembly